Gamma-glutamyltransferase 7 is an enzyme that in humans is encoded by the GGT7 gene.

Function 

Gamma-glutamyltransferase is a membrane-associated protein involved in both the metabolism of glutathione and in the transpeptidation of amino acids. Changes in the activity of gamma-glutamyltransferase may signal preneoplastic or toxic conditions in the liver or kidney. The protein encoded by this gene is similar in sequence to gamma-glutamyltransferase, but its function is unknown.

References

Further reading